Players and pairs who neither have high enough rankings nor receive wild cards may participate in a qualifying tournament held one week before the annual Wimbledon Tennis Championships.

Seeds

  Dejan Petrovic /  David Škoch (qualifying competition, lucky losers)
  Karol Beck /  Jaroslav Levinský (qualified)
  Sebastián Prieto /  Yuri Schukin (first round)
  Alexander Waske /  Lovro Zovko (qualified)
  Brandon Coupe /  Kevin Kim (first round)
  Justin Bower /  Shaun Rudman (first round)
  Amir Hadad /  Aisam-ul-Haq Qureshi (qualified)
  Tuomas Ketola /  Eric Taino (first round)

Qualifiers

  Robert Kendrick /  Rogier Wassen
  Karol Beck /  Jaroslav Levinský
  Amir Hadad /  Aisam-ul-Haq Qureshi
  Alexander Waske /  Lovro Zovko

Lucky losers
  Dejan Petrovic /  David Škoch

Qualifying draw

First qualifier

Second qualifier

Third qualifier

Fourth qualifier

External links

2002 Wimbledon Championships – Men's draws and results at the International Tennis Federation

Men's Doubles Qualifying
Wimbledon Championship by year – Men's doubles qualifying